Garra cornigera is a species of cyprinid fish in the genus Garra endemic to the Sanalok River in India.

References 

Garra
Fish described in 2015